Maria Izadora Ussher Calzado-Wintle (born August 12, 1982), known professionally as Iza Calzado, is a Filipino actress, television host, dancer and model. She is dubbed as the "Goddess of Horror Films" by local media for her acting prowess and haunting portrayals in acclaimed Filipino horror films. 

Calzado is regarded as one of the most versatile and successful women in Philippine show business. She was a semi-finalist for a nomination at the International Emmy Awards. She has won 2 Cinemalaya Film Festival Awards, 3 Golden Screen Awards, 3 PMPC Star Awards, 2 MMFF Awards, a Gawad Urian Award and 5 FAMAS Award nominations. She has won "Best Actress" at the 34th PMPC Star Awards. In 2017, she won the prestigious Yakushi Pearl Award at the Osaka Asian Film Festival. In 2021, she won "Best Performance by an Actress (TV Series)" at the 5th GEMS-Hiyas ng Sining Awards. The same year, she won "Outstanding TV Actress of the Year" with Jodi Sta. Maria at the 3rd Laguna Excellence Awards.

She was a former homegrown artist of GMA Network for ten years. In 2012, Calzado signed an exclusive contract with ABS-CBN, and also signed a non-exclusive contract with Star Cinema. Calzado is best known for her role as Sang'gre Amihan in the fantasy drama television series Encantadia, and as the First Darna in the superhero television series Mars Ravelo's Darna.

Throughout her career, Calzado has starred in multiple blockbuster films including: Starting Over Again (₱410 million), Etiquette for Mistresses (₱103 million),  Ouija (₱120 million), Moments of Love (₱100 million) and One True Love (₱95 million).

Early life
Born Maria Izadora Ussher Calzado, she was named after the American dancer Isadora Duncan. Her father was Lito Calzado, a choreographer and TV director. Her mother was Maria Antonia Ussher. She has an elder brother, Dash Calzado, who is a member of Legit Misfitz, a 1990s Pinoy rap group.

Calzado finished elementary at School of the Holy Spirit and high school at Miriam College. She went on to take her undergraduate degree in fine arts at the University of Santo Tomas.

Acting career

Before entering show business, Iza Calzado worked as a dubber for the Venezuelan telenovela Mis 3 Hermanas (known in the Philippines as All My Love).

Calzado started out as a guest teen star in the youth-oriented show, Click, which led to further roles. She was cast in Kung Mawawala Ka as the drama's antagonist, Phoebe. She then starred in her first protagonist role as Rosela in Te Amo, Maging Sino Ka Man, with Argentinean actor Segundo Cernadas. In 2005, Calzado portrayed the iconic character of Amihan in the hit fantasy drama series Encantadia, with Sunshine Dizon, Karylle, Diana Zubiri, and Dingdong Dantes; Calzado would continue reprising the role of Amihan in the sequels Etheria: Ang Ikalimang Kaharian ng Encantadia and Encantadia: Pag-ibig Hanggang Wakas. She was later starred in the drama series Impostora (2007) and All About Eve (2009).

Outside TV projects, Calzado has starred in the films Milan (2004), Sigaw (2004), Moments of Love (2006), Batanes: Sa Dulo ng Walang Hanggan (2007), The Echo (a 2008 American movie remake of Sigaw), and One True Love (2008). On January 18, 2008, she received the "Model Star Award" for the Asia Model Award Festival held in South Korea. In 2009, she hosted the Binibining Pilipinas 2009 beauty pageant.

In 2010, Calzado did some hosting duties in Healthy Cravings on QTV with Jeremy Favia, and The Sweet Life on GMA with Lucy Torres. She also appeared in the dramas Pilyang Kerubin and Beauty Queen. In 2011, she took over the character previously played by Regine Velasquez in the romantic comedy I Heart You, Pare!. Calzado's last TV project with GMA Network was in the sitcom Andres de Saya with Cesar Montano.

On January 24, 2012, Calzado signed a three-year exclusive contract with ABS-CBN. She appeared in the drama anthology Maalaala Mo Kaya to mark her 10th year in show business, and was also seen on the Sunday variety show ASAP. Calzado's first ABS-CBN drama series was Kahit Puso'y Masugatan with Andi Eigenmann, Jake Cuenca and Gabby Concepcion.

A 2014 Maalaala Mo Kaya episode featured a teenage Iza Calzado, portrayed by Empress Schuck, shows the story of her weight struggles and how she resolved her obesity issues. In the same year of 2014, Calzado hosted the reality program The Biggest Loser Pinoy Edition: Doubles, and she also starred with Piolo Pascual in the hit movie Starting Over Again and the family drama Hawak Kamay. In 2015, she made her theater debut in Sabel: Love and Passion. She later made a guest appearance in the first few episodes of FPJ's Ang Probinsyano, and was starred in the drama movie Etiquette for Mistresses.

Later on, Calzado had been cast in two drama series, A Love to Last (2017) starring Ian Veneracion and Bea Alonzo, and Ngayon at Kailanman (2018) starring Joshua Garcia and Julia Barretto. She was also in the Iflix's first original Filipino film, Mystified, wherein Calzado reunites with Encantadia co-stars Sunshine Dizon, Karylle and Diana Zubiri. She also appeared in the 2019 film Culion with Jasmine Curtis-Smith and Meryll Soriano.

In 2020, Calzado played Ellice in the drama Ang sa Iyo ay Akin, with Jodi Sta. Maria, Sam Milby, and Maricel Soriano. The production of Ang sa Iyo ay Akin lasted for almost a year, during the ABS-CBN shutdown and franchise denial in the COVID-19 pandemic. On August 12, 2021, the day of her 39th birthday, Calzado is confirmed to join the newest TV adaptation of superhero series Darna, starring Jane de Leon.

Personal life
Calzado married businessman Ben Wintle in December 2018.

During the first month of COVID-19 pandemic in the Philippines, Calzado was hospitalized on March 25, 2020, because of pneumonia. On March 28, she was tested positive for the coronavirus disease (COVID-19). On March 30, Calzado's manager Noel Ferrer announced that she already tested negative for COVID-19 and that she would be discharged from the hospital.

On August 12, 2022, her 40th birthday, Calzado announced that she and Wintle were expecting their first child, a girl.

Filmography

Television

Web series

Movies

Awards and nominations

References

External links
 

1982 births
Living people
People from Quezon City
Actresses from Metro Manila
That's Entertainment Monday Group Members
Bicolano actors
University of Santo Tomas alumni
Bicolano people
That's Entertainment (Philippine TV series)
GMA Network personalities
ABS-CBN personalities
Star Magic
Filipino television actresses
21st-century Filipino actresses
Filipino television variety show hosts
Filipino people of Spanish descent
Filipino people of Irish descent